Ivonne Teichmann (born 11 April 1977, in Zeulenroda) is a retired German athlete who specialised in the 800 metres.

She finished eighth at the 2001 World Championships and seventh at the 2002 European Championships.

Her personal best time was 1:58.62 minutes, achieved in August 2001 in Brussels.

International competitions

References 
 

1977 births
Living people
People from Zeulenroda-Triebes
People from Bezirk Gera
German female middle-distance runners
Sportspeople from Thuringia
World Athletics Championships athletes for Germany
German national athletics champions
20th-century German women